The list of tallest buildings in the Philippines, which ranks skyscrapers throughout the country.

Tallest completed buildings

This list ranks the highest completed skyscrapers and buildings in the Philippines as of July 2022. (See also the more updated List of tallest buildings in Metro Manila.)

Existing partially habitable structures are included for comparison purposes; however, they are not ranked.

 Was the tallest building in the Philippines upon completion

 Not in Metro Manila (four entries)

 Non-building structures / partially habitable structures

Not included in the list are buildings which have heights that are only estimated based on floor counts. There are over 70 completed buildings falling under this category, some of which include One Eastwood Avenue Towers 1 and 2 (≈160 m and ≈188 m), West Tower at One Serendra (≈170-191 m), The BeauFort East and West Towers (≈161 m and ≈164 m), Acqua Private Residences Iguazu (≈207 m), Livingstone (≈196 m), Dettifoss (≈170 m), Sutherland (≈163 m), and Niagara (≈155 m) Towers, and The Infinity Fort Bonifacio (≈183-187 m).

Buildings which almost qualify are One McKinley Place (149 m) in Bonifacio Global City, Mandarin Square (149 m)in Binondo, and SM Seaside City Cebu Tower (147 m) in Cebu City, Cebu.

Tallest unbuilt structures
The list includes proposed buildings and structures projected to be at least 250 meters in height.

List by geographical division
The following table shows the tallest buildings by the three main geographical divisions of the country: Luzon, Visayas and Mindanao.

Cities with the most high-rise and skyscrapers 
Philippine cities with the most number of buildings of at least  and 150 meters (480 ft) as of July 2022.

Timeline of tallest buildings

This lists buildings that once held the title of tallest building in the Philippines. Other buildings such as churches with tall spires may be taller but are not listed because there are no data available for these buildings.

See also

 List of tallest buildings in the world
 List of tallest twin buildings and structures in the world
 List of tallest buildings in Metro Manila

 List of tallest buildings in Baguio

 List of tallest buildings in Cebu
 List of tallest buildings in Iloilo

 List of tallest buildings in Cagayan de Oro
 List of tallest buildings in Davao City

References

Structures
Philippines
Philippines